Old Croghan Man (Seanfhear Chruacháin in Irish) is a well-preserved Irish Iron Age bog body found in June 2003. The remains are named after Croghan Hill, north of Daingean, County Offaly, near where the body was found. The find is on display in the National Museum of Ireland in Dublin. 
Old Croghan Man was found three months after a similar find, dubbed Clonycavan Man, in County Meath.

Life
The man's apparently manicured nails led to speculation that he was not someone who engaged in manual labour, and possibly therefore of high status.

His last meal (analysed from the contents in his stomach) was believed to have been wheat and buttermilk. However, he was shown to have had a meat rich diet for at least the 4 months prior to his death. Scars on his lungs suggest he may have suffered from pleurisy.

Death
The man was buried at a bog (likely once a lake) at the foot of an ancient hill that was used for kingship ceremonies. A 2014 documentary suggested that he was a king or prince who was sacrificed by druids due to poor weather or harvests. These ancient tribes may have believed that this was caused by the failure of the king and he was responsible.

Old Croghan Man is believed to have died between 362 BC and 175 BC, making the body over 2,000 years old. Evidence indicates that the man was in his early twenties when he was killed. He was naked except for a plaited leather band around his left arm. This likely indicated high status. The man is believed to have died from a stab wound to the chest. He was decapitated and had his body cut in half. He also has an injury to one arm, possible evidence that he tried to defend himself. A similar wound has been seen on the Cashel Man, who was found in 2011, also in Ireland.

The body was found to have deep cuts under each nipple. Several theories have been suggested to explain this, including that the damage was caused (after death) by conditions in the bog, that the cuts were indicative of torture while the man was alive, or that the nipples were deliberately mutilated (either before or after death) for symbolic purposes. The latter theory, put forward by Eamonn Kelly of the National Museum of Ireland, suggests that the mutilation was a symbolic gesture to mark the man as a rejected ruler. Other theories suggest that Old Croghan Man and other bog bodies were sacrifices to gods of fertility or harvest, and killed and buried to ensure good yields of cereals and buttermilk.

Arm-ring
The arm-ring found with the body was made from waterlogged leather, strands of fibres and four bronze mounts. According to Louise Mumford of the National Museum, the leather ring was made with two strands of leather joined through numerous small slits.

The ring was initially removed from the body and wet cleaned to remove elements like peat from the leather. To prevent further decay of the waterlogged leather work and mould growth the arm-ring was stored in a 20% solution of glycerol and de-ionised water for two weeks in a process called consolidation. After drying and further chemical cleaning and treatment to prevent corrosion, the arm-ring was returned to the body for display.

Related mythology
Croghan Hill is known as Bri Eile in Irish myth. In "The Boyhood Deeds of Fionn", we are told "At that time there was a very beautiful maiden in Bri Ele, that is to say, in the fairy-knoll of Bri Ele, and the name of that maiden was Ele. The men of Ireland were at feud about that maiden. One man after another went to woo her. Every year on Samain the wooing used to take place; for the fairy-mounds of Ireland were always open about Samain; for on Samain nothing could ever be hidden in the fairy-mounds. To each man that went to woo her this used to happen: one of his people was slain. This was done to mark the occasion, nor was it ever found out who did it."

See also
Clonycavan Man
 Cashel Man
 Bog body

References

2003 archaeological discoveries
Archaeological sites in County Offaly
Bog bodies
Bogs of Ireland
Celtic archaeological sites
Collection of the National Museum of Ireland
People from County Offaly
Prehistoric Ireland
Prehistoric burials in Ireland
Year of birth unknown
Year of death uncertain